Haut-Katanga (French for "Upper Katanga") is one of the 21 new provinces of the Democratic Republic of the Congo created in the 2015 repartitioning.  Haut-Katanga, Haut-Lomami, Lualaba, and Tanganyika provinces are the result of the dismemberment of the former Katanga province.  Haut-Katanga was formed from the Haut-Katanga district and the independently administered cities of Likasi and Lubumbashi.  Lubumbashi retained its status as a provincial capital.

The new province's territory corresponds to the historic Katanga-Oriental that existed in the early period after independence between 1963 and 1966.

Territories
Its current territories are:
 Kasenga	
 Kipushi	
 Mitwaba
 Pweto	
 Sakania

Approximate correspondence between historical and current province

References

 
Provinces of the Democratic Republic of the Congo
2015 establishments in the Democratic Republic of the Congo